Jordany V. Valdespin (born December 23, 1987) is a Dominican professional baseball player who is currently a free agent. He has played in Major League Baseball (MLB) for the New York Mets and Miami Marlins. He was suspended for 50 games during the 2013 Biogenesis baseball scandal.

Professional career

New York Mets
Valdespin began his professional career in 2007, playing for the DSL Mets. That year, he hit .245 with one home run and 16 RBIs in 43 games. In 2008, he played for the GCL Mets, hitting .284 with three home runs and 22 RBIs in 34 games. He split 2009 between the DSL Mets, GCL Mets, Brooklyn Cyclones and Savannah Sand Gnats, hitting a combined .298 with four home runs, 28 RBIs and 13 stolen bases in 67 games. He split 2010 between the St. Lucie Mets and Binghamton Mets, hitting a combined .272 with six home runs, 41 RBIs and 17 stolen bases in 93 games. In 2011, Valdespin hit .294 with 17 home runs, 60 RBIs and 37 stolen bases in the Mets minor league system.

2012 season
On April 23, 2012 Valdespin was called up for the second game in a doubleheader versus the San Francisco Giants. In his debut Valdespin pinch hit for Manny Acosta in the eighth inning. Valdespin started his first major league game on April 27, playing left field and batting eighth against the Miami Marlins. While pinch hitting on May 7, Valdespin collected his first major league hit, home run and RBI on a three-run home run against Jonathan Papelbon of the Philadelphia Phillies to break a tie in the ninth inning. That same hit made Valdespin the first player to ever record his first hit as a home run off a player who has 200 or more career saves. On July 24, he broke a Mets franchise record by hitting his fifth pinch-hit home run of the season, off of Ryan Mattheus of the Washington Nationals. On August 26 Valdespin was optioned to Triple-A but was recalled on September 4.

2013 season
Valdespin made the Opening Day roster for the New York Mets and was set to platoon in center field with Collin Cowgill. On April 24, 2013, Valdespin hit a walk off grand slam, the first Met to do so since Kevin McReynolds hit one on June 25, 1991 against the Montreal Expos.

On July 15, 2013, Valdespin was sent down to the AAA Las Vegas 51s after hitting only .188 that season, leading to a confrontation with manager Terry Collins in which Valdespin referred to his skipper as a cocksucker before demanding to be placed on the disabled list. This followed several incidents of showboating, most recently on May 11 and 12 when he hit celebrated a home run while down four runs in one game, then was hit by a pitch during a pinch hit appearance the next day in retaliation.

On August 5, 2013, Valdespin was suspended for 50 games from baseball for using performance-enhancing drugs obtained from Biogenesis. Valdespin was reinstated on September 25, 2013, and assigned to Triple-A. After the season, Valdespin was non-tendered by the Mets, making him a free agent.

Miami Marlins
On December 20, 2013 the Miami Marlins signed Valdespin to a minor league contract. He was called up to the Marlins on July 19, 2014. He was outrighted off the roster on October 10, 2014. He returned to the Major League roster on July 6, 2015. During the 2015 season, Valdespin hit .293 (75-for-256) with two home runs and 20 RBIs in 76 games for the Triple-A New Orleans Zephyrs.

Detroit Tigers
On December 23, 2015, the Detroit Tigers signed Valdespin to a minor league contract. He elected free agency on November 7, 2016.

Leones de Yucatán
On February 2, 2017, Valdespin signed with the Leones de Yucatán of the Mexican Baseball League. He was released on April 18, 2017.

Olmecas de Tabasco
On April 21, 2017, Valdespin signed with the Olmecas de Tabasco of the Mexican Baseball League. He was released on July 5, 2017.

Long Island Ducks
On March 15, 2018, Valdespin signed with the Long Island Ducks of the independent Atlantic League of Professional Baseball. He hit .338/.399/.487 with 12 home runs, 30 stolen bases and a league-leading 94 runs scored. He also led the league in triples (7) and hits (154). Despite coming up just short of winning the ALPB Batting Title, Valdespin was named the 2018 Independent Leagues Player of the Year by Baseball America.

Minnesota Twins
On January 25, 2019, Valdespin signed a minor league deal with the Minnesota Twins that included an invitation to spring training. He started the 2019 season with the Rochester Red Wings. Valdespin was released on August 9, 2019.

On January 7, 2020, Valdespin signed with the Toros de Tijuana of the Mexican League. Valdespin did not play in a game in 2020 due to the cancellation of the Mexican League season because of the COVID-19 pandemic. He later became a free agent

Lexington Legends
On March 4, 2022, Valdespin signed with the Lexington Legends of the Atlantic League of Professional Baseball. He was released on August 9, 2022.

References

External links

1987 births
Living people
Binghamton Mets players
Brooklyn Cyclones players
Buffalo Bisons (minor league) players
Dominican Republic expatriate baseball players in Mexico
Dominican Republic expatriate baseball players in the United States
Dominican Republic sportspeople in doping cases
Dominican Summer League Mets players
Gulf Coast Mets players
Las Vegas 51s players
Leones de Yucatán players
Long Island Ducks players
Major League Baseball outfielders
Major League Baseball second basemen
Major League Baseball shortstops
Major League Baseball players from the Dominican Republic
Major League Baseball players suspended for drug offenses
Mesa Solar Sox players
Mexican League baseball left fielders
Mexican League baseball right fielders
Mexican League baseball second basemen
Mexican League baseball third basemen
Miami Marlins players
New Orleans Zephyrs players
New York Mets players
Olmecas de Tabasco players
Sportspeople from San Pedro de Macorís
Rochester Red Wings players
Savannah Sand Gnats players
St. Lucie Mets players
Tigres del Licey players
Toledo Mud Hens players
Toros del Este players